Emotional disturbance may refer to:

Emotional and behavioral disorders, most frequently used in an educational context
Mental disorders, especially those involving emotions or emotional disorders
Emotional trauma
Emotional distress
Mania and depression
Anxiety, fear, extreme sadness or anger, and other emotions that may disturb the mental state of an individual